Edward Danner Ziegler (March 3, 1844 – December 21, 1931) was a Democratic member of the U.S. House of Representatives from Pennsylvania.

Early life
Edward Danner Ziegler was born on March 3, 1844, in Bedford, Pennsylvania. He graduated from Pennsylvania College at Gettysburg, Pennsylvania, in 1865.

He was engaged in teaching in the York County Academy. He studied law, was admitted to the bar in 1868, and commenced practice in York, Pennsylvania.

Career
He served as commissioner's clerk in 1871 and 1872, counsel to the board of commissioners, and district attorney of York County, Pennsylvania, from 1881 to 1883. He was a delegate to the 1884 Democratic National Convention.

Zeigler was elected as a Democrat to the Fifty-sixth Congress. He was an unsuccessful candidate for renomination in 1900. He resumed the practice of law, and was appointed by the judge of the court of common pleas of York County to be the auditor of the offices of prothonotary, register of wills, clerk of the court, treasurer, and recorder of York County and served from 1923 to 1925.

He resumed the practice of law in York until his death there in 1931.  He was interred in Prospect Hill Cemetery.

References

Sources

The Political Graveyard

1844 births
1931 deaths
Pennsylvania lawyers
Politicians from York, Pennsylvania
Gettysburg College alumni
Democratic Party members of the United States House of Representatives from Pennsylvania